Minuscule 402 (in the Gregory-Aland numbering), ε 428 (in Soden's numbering), is a Greek minuscule manuscript of the New Testament, on parchment. Palaeographically it has been assigned to the 14th century.
It has marginalia.

Description 

The codex contains a complete text of the 4 Gospels on 253 parchment leaves. It is written in 1 column per page, in 24 lines per page.

Text 

The Greek text of the codex is a representative of the Byzantine text-type. Hermann von Soden classified it to the textual family Kr. Aland placed it in Category V.
According to the Claremont Profile Method it belongs to the textual family Kr in Luke 1 and Luke 20. In Luke 10 no profile was made. It belongs to subgroup 35.

History 

The manuscript was added to the list of New Testament manuscripts by Scholz (1794–1852).
C. R. Gregory saw the manuscript in 1886.

The manuscript is currently housed at the Biblioteca Nazionale Vittorio Emanuele III (Ms. II. A. 5) in Naples.

See also 

 List of New Testament minuscules
 Biblical manuscript
 Textual criticism

References

Further reading 

 

Greek New Testament minuscules
14th-century biblical manuscripts